The Zimbabwean records in swimming are ratified by the Zimbabwe Aquatic Union (ZAU) for the fastest performances by Zimbabwean nationals in both long course (50 m) and short course (25 m) pools.

Records marked with a hash (#) are currently awaiting ratification by ZAU or have been obtained since the last version of the official lists. All records were achieved in finals unless otherwise specified.

Long course (50 m)

Men

Women

Mixed relay

Short course (25 m)

Men

Women

References

External links
Zimbabwe Aquatic Union
Zimbabwean Long Course Records – Men & Mixed Relay 
Zimbabwean Long Course Records – Women 
Zimbabwean Short Course Records – Men 
Zimbabwean Short Course Records – Women 

Zimbabwe
Records
Swimming
Swimming